General elections were held in South Africa on 7 July 1943 to elect the 150 members of the House of Assembly. The United Party of Jan Smuts won an absolute majority.

Although the United Party was victorious, special wartime circumstances such as soldiers on active service being allowed to vote and Smuts's status as an international statesman probably exaggerated the depth and level of attachment to the United Party.

The elections might also have understated Afrikaner support for nationalist policies, as many newly urbanised Afrikaners had not registered as voters. In addition, the infighting between the various Afrikaner political factions reduced their support during the election. However, this election was the beginning of the rise of D. F. Malan as the dominant spokesman for Afrikanerdom, which would come to fruition in the 1948 elections.

Background
There were significant changes to the South African party system, during the 1938-1943 Parliament.

The United Party split in 1939, over the issue of South Africa's participation in the Second World War. The Prime Minister since 1924, General J. B. M. Hertzog, advocated neutrality. The then Deputy Prime Minister, General Jan Smuts, supported South African involvement in the war. The cabinet were evenly split on the issue, which had to be resolved by a Parliamentary vote.

Smuts won the vote in the House of Assembly. He was then called upon to form a government. A wartime coalition ministry was appointed. The Smuts cabinet included pro-war members of the United Party, as well as the leaders of the Dominion and Labour parties.

Hertzog and some of his followers left the United Party and created the People Party (VP - Volksparty). This group merged with the Purified National Party (GNP - Gesuiwerde Nasionale Party), to form the Reunited National Party (HNP - Herenigde Nasionale Party). Hertzog was the first leader of the new party, from January 1940, but later in the year Hertzog resigned after falling out with his new colleagues and some of his followers then formed the Afrikaner Party.

Another Nationalist politician and former cabinet minister, Oswald Pirow, formed the New Order. This was at first a faction within the GNP, but later became a new far right party.<ref>Smuts: A Reappraisal</ref>

Native representative members
The first term of the (white MPs) elected to represent black voters, from special electoral districts in Cape Province under the Representation of Natives Act 1936, expired on 30 June 1942. These seats were not vacated by a dissolution of Parliament, so they were not contested at the 1943 general election for the 150 general roll seats.

The three representative seats were filled by elections on different dates in the second half of 1942 (19 August 1942, 26 October 1942 and 29 October 1942). Three Independent MPs were returned. The term of these members expired on 30 June 1948 (the first 30 June to fall after five years from the date of election).

Delimitation of electoral divisions
The South Africa Act 1909 had provided for a delimitation commission to define the boundaries for each electoral division. The representation by province, under the eighth delimitation report of 1942, is set out in the table below. The figures in brackets are the number of electoral divisions in the previous (1937) delimitation. If there is no figure in brackets then the number was unchanged.

The above table does not include the three native representative seats in Cape Province, which were not included in the delimitation of the general roll seats under the South Africa Act 1909.

Results

By province

References
 Keesing's Contemporary Archives Smuts: A Reappraisal, by Bernard Friedman (George, Allen & Unwin 1975) 
 South Africa 1982 Official Yearbook of the Republic of South Africa, published by Chris van Rensburg Publications
 The South African Constitution'', by H.J. May (3rd edition 1955), Juta & Co

General elections in South Africa
South Africa
General
July 1943 events